

The Messerschmitt M 28 was a mail plane developed in Germany in the early 1930s to meet a requirement by Deutsche Luft Hansa. It was a single-engine, low-wing cantilever monoplane of conventional design with an enclosed cockpit and fixed, tailskid undercarriage.

Despite successful trials, Luft Hansa changed its requirement and did not purchase the design, due possibly at least partly to the enmity of Luft Hansa director Erhard Milch towards Messerschmitt. This would be Messerschmitt's final attempt to market a commercial aircraft in Germany (the Messerschmitt M 36 was designed specifically for Romania), with the company subsequently returning to the production of sport aircraft instead.

Specifications

Notes

References

1930s German mailplanes
M 28
Low-wing aircraft